Frederick Feil was an American football player and coach.  He was the 14th head football coach at Wabash College in Crawfordsville, Indiana serving for one season, in 1901, and compiling a record of 4–7.  Fiel played college football at the University of Chicago.

Head coaching record

References

Year of birth missing
Year of death missing
19th-century players of American football
American football tackles
Chicago Maroons football players
Wabash Little Giants football coaches